Michael Lewis (15 February 1965 – 5 March 2021) was an English professional footballer and manager who played for West Bromwich Albion,  Derby County and Oxford United. From October 1999 to February 2000 and then again from January to March 2014 he was the caretaker manager at League Two side Oxford United following the departure of manager Chris Wilder to Northampton Town, before Gary Waddock was appointed head coach.

He left Oxford in the middle of 2015 after a 27-year association with the club, and 8 years as a member of the coaching staff, and was appointed head coach/manager at Hayes & Yeading United in May 2016 after the departure of Garry Haylock. He stepped down as first-team manager in October 2016.

Death 
Lewis died on 5 March 2021, aged 56, shortly after being diagnosed with lung cancer.

References

1965 births
2021 deaths
Footballers from Birmingham, West Midlands
English footballers
Association football midfielders
Association football defenders
Derby County F.C. players
West Bromwich Albion F.C. players
Oxford United F.C. players
Des Moines Menace players
English Football League players
English football managers
Oxford United F.C. managers
Hayes & Yeading United F.C. managers
English expatriate sportspeople in the United States
Expatriate soccer players in the United States
English expatriate footballers
Oxford United F.C. non-playing staff
Doncaster Rovers F.C. non-playing staff
Deaths from lung cancer in England